Garsdale is a civil parish in the South Lakeland District of Cumbria, England.  It contains 62 listed buildings that are recorded in the National Heritage List for England.  Of these, three are listed at Grade II*, the middle of the three grades, and the others are at Grade II, the lowest grade.  The parish is in the Yorkshire Dales National Park, it contains the village of Garsdale and the hamlet of Garsdale Head, and is otherwise rural.  The A684 road runs through the valley, and most of the listed buildings are situated along, or are close to this road.  The Settle–Carlisle line of the former Midland Railway passes through the eastern part of the parish, and the listed buildings associated with this are a viaduct, a bridge and a station box.  Most of the other listed buildings are farmhouses, farm buildings, and houses and associated structures.  Also listed are other bridges, milestones, a church, chapels, and a boundary marker.


Key

Buildings

Notes and references

Notes

Citations

Sources

Lists of listed buildings in Cumbria